This is a list of publishers of children's books. The publishers may be independent, an imprint of a larger publisher, and may be currently operating or out of business.

{| class="wikitable sortable"
|+
!Publisher
!City
!Administrative Division
!Country
!Est.
!Notable Books, Series, or Franchises
!Notes
|-
|Adarna House
|Quezon City
|
|Philippines
|1980
|
|
|-
|Affirm Press
|Melbourne
|
|Australia
|2010
|
|Began publishing children's books in 2017.
|-
|American Girl
|
|
|United States
|1986
|American Girl series
|Owned by Mattel
|-
|Annick Press
|Toronto
|Ontario
|Canada
|1975
|Classic Robert Munsch series
The Paper Bag Princess
|
|-
|Anvil Publishing
|Mandaluyong
|
|Philippines
|1990
|
|
|-
|Arbordale Publishing
|Mount Pleasant
|South Carolina
|United States
|2004
|
|Nonfiction topics include science, math, and folklore
|-
|Barefoot Books
|Cambridge
|Massachusetts
|United States
|1992
|
|
|-
|Beaver's Pond Press
|Saint Paul
|Minnesota
|United States
|1998
|Pockets of Joy by Roxane Battle
Tell My Sons by Lt. Col. Mark M. Weber
|
|-
|Bendon Publishing International
|Ashland
|Ohio
|United States
|2001
|
|
|-
|Big Guy Books
|Encinitas
|California
|United States
|
|
|
|-
|Bloomsbury
|London
New York City

New Delhi
|England
New York
|United Kingdom
United States

India
|1986
|Harry Potter
|
|-
|The Book House for Children
|
|
|
|1919
|
|Now defunct
|-
|Candlewick Press
|Somerville
|Massachusetts
|United States
|1991
|Judy Moody and Stink franchises

Guess How Much I Love You

Where's Waldo? books

Because of Winn-Dixie 
|Part of Walker Books Group
Distributed by Penguin Random House Publishers Services
|-
|Capstone Publishers
|Mankato
|Minnesota
|United States
|1990
|
|Imprints and divisions include Capstone Press, Compass Point Books, Picture Window Books, Stone Arch Books, Red Brick Learning, Capstone Digital, Heinemann-Raintree and Switch Press
|-
|-
|Children's Press
|
|
|United States
|1945
|Rookie Read-About series

True Book series

Young People's series (Young People's Animal Encyclopedia, Young People's Science Encyclopedia, Young People's Science Dictionary, Young People's World)
|Spelled as Childrens Press until 1996. Originally based in Chicago, Illinois prior to its acquisition by Grolier in 1995 and has a secondary imprint, Franklin Watts. Became an imprint of Scholastic Corporation in 2000.
|-
|Chronicle Books
|San Francisco
|California
|United States
|1967
|The Art of... series

Olive, the Other Reindeer

What's Your Poo Telling You?
|
|-
|Cuento de Luz
|Madrid
|
|Spain
|2007
|
|
|-
|David Fickling Books
|Oxford
|England
|United Kingdom
|
|The Curious Incident of the Dog in the Night-time by Mark Haddon

The Boy in the Striped Pyjamas by John Boyne
|
|-
|DK (formerly Dorling Kindersley)
|London
|England
|United Kingdom
|1974
|
|Division of Penguin Random House
|-
|Dutton Children's Books
|
|
|United States
|1852
|Winnie-the-Pooh books

Rumpelstiltskin by Paul O. Zelinsky

Looking for Alaska by John Green
|Division of Penguin Random House
|-
|Egmont Publishing
|Copenhagen
|
|Denmark
|1878
|
|
|-
|Eklavya foundation
|Bhopal
|Madhya Pradesh
|India
|
|
|
|-
|Enslow Publishing
|Berkeley Heights
|New Jersey
|United States
|1976
|
|
|-
|Faber and Faber
|London 
|England
|United Kingdom
|1929
|Old Possum's Book of Practical Cats
Lord of the Flies
|
|-
|Figures In Motion
|Bellingham 
|Washington
|United States
|2008
|Famous Figures series
|
|-
|Fremantle Press
|Fremantle
|
|Australia
|1976
|Destroying Avalon
|
|-
|Gallimard Jeunesse
|Paris
|
|France
|
|
|Subsidiary of Éditions Gallimard
|-
|Gecko Press
|Wellington
|
|New Zealand
|2005
|Duck, Death and the Tulip
|
|-
|Golden Books
|Racine
|Wisconsin
|United States
|
|
|Defunct 2001
Little Golden Books remains as an imprint of Penguin Random House
|-
|Goops Unlimited
|
|
|
|
|
|
|-
|HarperCollins
|New York City
|New York
|United States
United Kingdom
|1989
|Frog and Toad

A Series of Unfortunate Events

The Giving Tree

Where the Sidewalk Ends (book)

Divergent
|
|-
|Hogs Back Books
|Guildford, Surrey
|England
|United Kingdom
|2010
|Boris the Boastful Frog
|
|-
|J. Lumsden and Son
|
|Scotland
|United Kingdom
|1783
|
|
|-
|Kerala State Institute of Children's Literature
|
|Kerala
|India
|1981
|
|
|-
|Kids Can Press
|Toronto
|Ontario
|Canada
|1973
|
|
|-
|Kim Đồng Publishing House
|Hanoi
|
|Vietnam
|1957
|
|
|-
|Ladybird Books
|London
|England
|United Kingdom
|1867
|
|Imprint of Penguin Random House
|-
|Lee & Low Books
|New York City
|New York
|United States
|1991
|Baseball Saved Us
|
|-
|Lerner Publishing Group
|Minneapolis
|Minnesota
|United States
|1959
|Unspeakable: The Tulsa Race Massacre Randolph Caldecott Medal Honor Book, Commended, 2022

Monkey with a Tool Belt the inspiration behind Chico Bon Bon: Monkey with a Tool Belt

Where I Belong

Classified: The Secret Career of Mary Golda Ross, Cherokee Aerospace Engineer
|Independently owned and operated since 1959 with 14 imprints including Kar-Ben Publishing and Graphic Universe
|-
|Mackinac Island Press
|
|
|
|
|
|
|-
|Magabala Books
|Broome
|
|Australia
|1987
|
|
|-
|McLoughlin Brothers
|
|
|United States
|1858
|Beverly Gray
|Defunct 1920
|-
|Miles Kelly Publishing
|Bardfield End Green, Essex
|England
|United Kingdom
|1996
|
|-
|Nosy Crow
|London
|England
|United Kingdom
|2010
|Bizzy Bear books

Pip and Posy books
|Imprint of Candlewick Press
|-
|Orchard Books
|
|
|
|1986
|
|Orchard Books UK is maintained by Hachette.

Hachette, which acquired Grolier in 1988, sold Grolier to Scholastic Corporation in 2000, along with the U.S. branch of Orchard Books, while retaining the UK branch
|-
|Orion
|London
|England
|United Kingdom
|1998
|
|
|-
|Peace Hill Press
|Charles City
|Virginia
|United States
|
|The Story of the World by Susan Wise Bauer
|
|-
|Prometheus Books
|Amherst
|New York
|United States
|1969
|
|
|-
|Purple House Press
|Cynthiana
|Kentucky
|United States
|2000
|
|
|-
|Random House
|New York City
|New York
|United States
|1927
|
|
|-
|Roaring Brook Press
|
|
|
|
|
|Imprint of Macmillan Children's Publishing Group
|-
|Salariya Book Company
|Brighton
|England
|United Kingdom
|1989
|
|
|-
|Scholastic
|New York City
|New York
|United States
|1920
|Clifford the Big Red Dog

The Magic School Bus

Goosebumps
|
|-
|Simon & Schuster
|New York City
|New York
|United States
|1924
|
|
|-
|Skyhorse Publishing
|
|
|
|
|
|
|-
|SRL Publishing
|London
|England
|United Kingdom
|2014
|
|-
|Tamarind Books
|
|
|United Kingdom
|1987
|
|Now an imprint of Random House Children's Books UK
|-
|Text Publishing
|Melbourne
|
|Australia
|1990
|Zac & MiaWatch Over Me
|
|-
|The Quarto Group
|London
|England
|United Kingdom
|1976
|
|Many imprints.
Distribution by Hachette
|-
|Tulika Publishers
|Chennai
|Tamil Nadu
|India
|1996
|
|
|-
|Tu Books
|New York City
|New York
|United States
|2009
|Summer of the Mariposas
|Young adult and middle grade publishing imprint of Lee & Low Books
|-
|Tundra Books
|Toronto
|Ontario
|Canada
|1967
|
|
|-
|Usborne Publishing
|
|
|United Kingdom
|1973
|
|
|-
|Walker Books
|London
|England
|United Kingdom
|1978
|Where's Wally?
|
|}

See also
 List of English language book publishers
List of UK children's book publishers

References

External links
 Nineteenth-Century American Children's Book Trade Directory

Children's